Crespignano is a village in Tuscany, central Italy, administratively a frazione of the comune of Calci, province of Pisa.

It is about 12 km from Pisa and 3 km from the municipal seat of La Pieve.

References

Bibliography 
 

Frazioni of the Province of Pisa